Deutsche Buddhistische Union ("German Buddhist Union", abbreviation: DBU) is a German national umbrella organisation for Buddhist associations registered in Germany. DBU has estimated that there are 250 000 Buddhists in Europe and the religion is growing. As of June 2021 DBU has 62 member organizations.

DBU was founded in 1955 by Buddhists from Berlin, Munich and Hamburg. At first the union was called "German Buddhist Society" (German: Deutsche Buddhistische Gesellschaft). The name was changed in 1958. As of 1981 DBU has been recognized as a non-profit organization.

DBU is a member of the European Buddhist Union. The union is also closely associated with the Network of Buddhist Women in Europe.

The magazine of the union is Buddhismus Aktuell.

See also 
 Buddhism in Germany
 European Buddhist Union

References 

Buddhism in Germany
Organizations established in 1955
Organisations based in Germany